Huang Xiaoyun (born 22 December 1998), is a Chinese singer and actress of Bouyei ethnicity. She first gained recognition in the Chinese television talent show The Voice of China 4 in 2015 and later on in 2020, when she was a competitor on Hunan TV's Singer 2020.

Huang Xiaoyun is known for her vocals and wide vocal range, as well as her viral performance of "Upwards to the Moon" on Sound of My Dream. The performance gained over 10 million views on YouTube.

Early life 
On 22 December 1998, Huang Xiaoyun was born in Longping Town, Luodian County, Qiannan Buyei and Miao Autonomous Prefecture, Guizhou, China. Her parents discovered that she was able to accurately hum the tune of music being played when she was 6 months old and her father taught her how to play the drums when she was 2. Soon afterwards, she participated as a drummer in a band organised by her parents, known as "Le Wanjia". After that, she studied how to play the piano and guzheng. In the following years, she participated in local singing competitions every year and achieved positive results. When she was in the third year of middle school, she went to Guiyang every weekend to learn bel canto, to pass the entrance exam for the high school affiliated to the Central Conservatory of Music. In September she was admitted with satisfactory results and continued to study bel canto.

Career

2015: The Voice of China 

In 2015, Huang Xiaoyun participated in the fourth season of The Voice of China and sang Jam Hsiao's song "You" (你) in the "blind audition" stage, during which both Yu Chengqing and Wang Feng turned around, and she finally decided to join the latter's team. Later on, she sang Sun Nan's "I Believe" and Yao Beina's "Fish" (鱼) in the "mentor assessment" stage, becoming one of the top 4 students of Wang Feng's team and also top 16 overall, but her performance caused some controversy. In the Cross Battle round, she sang Eric Carmen's "All by Myself", but ended up losing the Cross Battle and was eliminated.

2017–2019: First singles released and Sound of My Dream 
On 14 December 2017, she released her first single, "Campaign" (征战), in which she tried adding the element of rapping for the first time. On 31 December, she released her second single, "Can We Still Love" (还可以爱吗). On 7 May 2018, she released her first self-composed single "Open" (打开).

In December, she participated in Zhejiang TV's music show  Sound of My Dream (season 3), and her first performance of "Upwards to the Moon" 左手指月 went viral. Other songs she performed in the show include "The Light At That Time" (那时的光), "Unparalleled in the World" (天下无双), "The Story of Time" (光阴的故事) and "Same Moonlight" (一样的月光).

2020-present: Singer 2020, other variety shows and first solo album 

In January 2020, she represented the Central Conservatory of Music in the Zhejiang TV music program 新声请指教.

In February, she participated as a 'Surprise Challenger' in the Hunan TV music program Singer 2020, entitled Year of the Hits (歌手·当打之年). In the first round, she challenged Mao Buyi and successfully proceeded to the next round. However, a number of Chinese netizens accused her of being discourteous and having low EQ, as Mao had only started to sing the first few lyrics before she requested to challenge him. Since then, some netizens also discovered that the song she sang in the episode, "Life of Planet" by Mayday, was not on any music platform because Mango TV did not buy the copyright. After the third round of the competition, she was at the bottom of the overall rankings and was eventually eliminated. She returned for the breakout round of the show and chose to challenge Jike Junyi, but her challenge failed and she did not proceed to the finals. On 11 April, she also participated as a guest singer in Zhejiang TV's music program, The Treasured Voice.

In May, she and Zheng Shuang, Xiong Ziqi, and Liu Wei together formed the "President of the Star Trading Company" team in the Youku e-commerce variety show "Arrival of the Best-seller! 2" (爆款来了2). She was also the contributing artist to the show's theme song.

On 16 November, her first solo music album, "Huang Xiaoyun's Neverland", was released.

Artistry

Voice and timbre 
Huang Xiaoyun is a soprano.

Discography

Singles

Albums

Filmography

Television Series

Variety Shows

References

External links 
 
 Huang Xiaoyun on QQ Music 
 Huang Xiaoyun on NetEase Music 
 Huang Xiaoyun on Kuwo Music 
 Huang Xiaoyun on Spotify

1998 births
Living people
Chinese Mandopop singers
21st-century Chinese women singers
Singers from Guizhou
Actresses from Guizhou
Bouyei people